Deroo's mouse or Deroo's praomys (Praomys derooi) is a species of rodent in the family Muridae.
It is found in Benin, Ghana, Nigeria, and Togo.
Its natural habitats are dry savanna and urban areas.

References

 Van der Straeten, E. & Decher, J. 2004.  Praomys derooi.   2006 IUCN Red List of Threatened Species.   Downloaded on 19 July 2007.

Praomys
Mammals described in 1978
Taxonomy articles created by Polbot